Dendronotus gracilis is a species of sea slug, a dendronotid nudibranch, a shell-less marine gastropod mollusc in the family Dendronotidae.

Distribution 
This species was described from Sagami Bay, Japan. It has been reported from Okinawa and New Zealand.

References

Dendronotidae
Gastropods described in 1949